Alif is a 2019 Pakistani spiritual-romantic TV series created by Sana Shahnawaz and Samina Humayun Saeed under their newly formed production house Epic Entertainment. It was written by Umera Ahmad based on her novel of same name and directed by Haseeb Hassan. It starred Hamza Ali Abbasi, Sajal Aly, Kubra Khan and Ahsan Khan in leading roles.Sajal aly's performance as Momina is now regarded as one of the best performance in pakistan's television history.

The drama serial premiered on 5 October 2019 in Pakistan on Geo TV. The  serial received acclaim, mostly critics praising the, direction, writing, location, performance and cinematography of serial. At 20th Lux Style Awards, the series won Best Television writer for Ahmad out of nine categories.

Synopsis 
Alif is the journey of Momin and Momina, where Momin's journey is to rediscover his roots and to choose the right path while Momina's journey is to maintain the livelihood of her family by fateful events their paths will join. The story also entails Momin' mother Husn-e-Jahan.

It depicts that how a rebellious film-maker and a struggling actress, both having disturbed pasts come-across the same path and understand the terminology of the alphabet Alif illustrating the bond of an individual with his God.

Cast 

 Hamza Ali Abbasi as Qalb-E-Momin
 Aadi Khan as Qalb-E-Momin (young)
 Manzar Sehbai as Abdul Alaa (Dada Jaan)
 Sajal Aly as Momina Sultan
 Kubra Khan as Husn-E-Jahan
 Ahsan Khan as Taha Abdul Aala 
 Saleem Meraj as Sultan Shah
 Osman Khalid Butt as Faisal Khan
 Pehlaaj Hassan as Momin in childhood
 Fareeha Raza as Aqsa
 Musaddiq Malik as Dawood
 Sadaf Kanwal as Neha
 Shakeel Hussain Khan as Akhter
 Yashma Gill as Shelly
 Lubna Aslam as Suraiyya
 Hina Ashfaq as Tina
 Hadi bin Arshad as Jahangir
 Nida Mumtaz as Mumtaz Begum
 Salman Saeed as Abbas
 Saife Hassan as Master Ibrahim
 George Fulton as Cliff Hector
 Fahad Ahmed as Husn-e-Jahan's brother
 Umer Darr as Shakooor
 Farrukh Darbaar as Jhoomar

Guest appearances

Shuja Haider as himself
 Arjumand Azhar as Khalid
 Anas Ali Imran as Abdul Alaa Fan

Reception 
Despite not doing well commercially received instant acclaim upon its premiere but became the second - highest rated Pakistani Television Play on IMDb.

Writing for Images Dawn, Sadaf Haider wrote, "With a multi-layered storyline and intelligently developed characters, Team Alif deserves a standing ovation". She also mentioned, "The entire serial is studded with fantastic performances" with special praise for Khan, Abbasi and Aly labelling their performances as "outstanding" and "impactful"  Further noting, "Overall, this is one of the most refined and artistically pleasing dramas we have seen on our screens in years" and concluded by writing, "Team Alif needs to take a bow and sit back and revel in the glow of all this praise; it's well deserved". Sajal aly's performance was widely appreciated stating that one of the best performance in pakistan television history.

Rameeza Naseem from Oye Yeah also lauded the play and exclaimed, "The play has been brilliantly written by the veteran writer Umaira Ahmed and kudos to the entire team for creating such a masterpiece, the script, performances, and execution everything is on point".

Production 
"Alif touches upon the questions you ask yourself; questions about life and what it means", Sana Shahnawaz told Something Haute and The Express Tribune. "You’ll see how the lives of all the characters are connected with this single alphabet".

Filming
The principal photography began in June 2018, with initial filming in Turkey.

Awards and nominations

References

External links

Television series directed by Haseeb Hassan
Serial drama television series
Television series written by Umera Ahmad
2019 Pakistani television series debuts
Urdu-language television shows